Zinc finger protein 451 is a novel nuclear protein that in humans is encoded by the ZNF451 gene.

References

Further reading

External links 
 

Transcription factors